Jim Moray (born 1981) is an English folk singer, multi-instrumentalist and record producer.

Recording artist
While studying classical composition at the Birmingham Conservatoire, Moray released the home-recorded I Am Jim Moray EP. During 2002 he appeared at the Glastonbury festival and the Cambridge Folk Festival gaining notice in the music press. A nomination for the "Horizon Award" at the BBC Radio 2 Folk Awards 2003 followed before he began work on his first full-length album, Sweet England. The album was recorded in his bedroom while completing his final year of study. Sweet England was released in June 2003 on his own Niblick Is A Giraffe record label.

At the BBC Radio 2 Folk Awards in 2004 he was presented with the Album of the Year Award for Sweet England and the Horizon Award for best newcomer. He was also nominated twice in the Best Traditional Song category for Early One Morning and Lord Bateman.

Moray recorded and released the single Sprig of Thyme in May 2004, and in the autumn appeared on the Oysterband's Big Session Volume 1 album. This gained yet more Folk Award nominations in 2005, including one for Cuckoo's Nest, which was sung, produced and mixed by Moray.

After a long gestation period, Moray's eponymous second album was released on 1 May 2006. Moving away from the electronic sound of Sweet England it features a more orchestral sound and denser song structures.

On 6 July 2007, The Independent featured Sweet England in its "Cult Classic" series, affirming its impact and influence on the modern folk scene.

Jim Moray's third album, Low Culture, was released on 14 July 2008. On this album Jim makes use of African kora, the melodeon and mandolin and mbira thumb-piano.  Low Culture won the fRoots Critics Poll Album of the Year 2008 and was also the MOJO Folk Album of the Year 2008.  It was also nominated for the Album of the Year Award in the BBC Folk Awards 2009.

On 1 February 2010 it was announced that Jim Moray's fourth album In Modern History would be given away as a covermount CD with the June edition of Songlines magazine, with a street date of 30 April 2010. It was also announced that the album would be available in a deluxe box set and standard editions on 7 June 2010.

Moray's fifth studio album Skulk was released on Bandcamp with no build-up or warning in January 2012 going straight to number 1 on the Bandcamp chart. It received a full release on 9 April 2012. Moray received three nominations in the BBC Radio 2 Folk Awards for Best Album, Folk Singer of the Year and Best Traditional Track (for Lord Douglas), winning the latter category. 

Along with singer and guitarist Sam Carter, in 2014 Moray launched a new band named False Lights to play traditional music with electric instruments. Their album Salvor, produced by Moray, was released in February 2015 and they announced headline shows at Folk East, Trowbridge Village Pump and Homegrown festivals.

Moray's sixth album Upcetera was released on September the 30th 2016, featuring orchestral arrangements blended with electric rhythm section, electronic soundscapes and, on several tracks, viol played by Damon Albarn and Nico Muhly collaborator Liam Byrne. It was nominated for Best Album and Best Original Track for Sounds Of Earth at the 2017 BBC Radio 2 Folk Awards, at which he also performed the opening track Fair Margaret And Sweet William.  

On Moray's seventh album The Outlander he explored a more stripped down style of playing and arranging influenced by the British folk revival of the 1960s and 70s and featuring Bellowhead fiddle player Sam Sweeney on six tracks. It was released on 11th October 2019 and was Moray's first album to be released on vinyl as well as CD and download.

Producer
Aside from all of his own albums Moray has produced other artists, initially from his own studio in Bristol profiled in a Sound on Sound feature in 2006.

Moray produced and mixed the track "The Cuckoo's Nest" for the Oysterband Big Session in 2004. This was a live album, recorded over two nights, featuring a similar line-up to the tour he took part in in 2003. The track was nominated in the BBC Folk Awards that year.

During 2005 Moray produced and performed on James Raynard's debut album Strange Histories, released in September 2005 on One Little Indian records.

In 2008 he wrote and produced the song The Wishfulness Waltz for his sister Jackie Oates' second album The Violet Hour, as well as playing all the instruments on the track. He subsequently produced and mixed her third album Hyperboreans which was released in September 2009 and nominated for three BBC Radio 2 Folk Awards (including best album), and MOJO magazine's top folk albums of 2009. In 2015 he produced and mixed her sixth album "The Spyglass And The Herringbone" as well as co-writing the majority of the tracks.

Moray produced and mixed the debut album Roodumdah by Kent-based folk-rock band Wheeler Street in autumn 2008. In 2010 he produced and mixed Find The Lady by Belshazzar's Feast.

In 2014 he produced and mixed the second album by singer and songwriter Maz O'Connor, This Willowed Light. They worked together again on her third album The Longing Kind. In the same period he also produced the debut album by London folk band Tir Eolas, Stories Sung, Truths Told. 

Moray produced Salvor, the debut album by False Lights – his collaboration with Sam Carter, in 2015. The band released Harmonograph, a second album also produced by Moray in 2018. 

Moray produced Art Brut's fifth album Wham! Bang! Pow! Let's Rock Out!, after previously collaborating with lead singer Eddie Argos on the lo-fi musical The Islanders at the Edinburgh Fringe in 2013. The album was released by Alcopop! Records in 2018.

Live performer
Moray's early live shows frequently featured video projections and lighting effects, something relatively uncommon in British folk music.

During 2001–2003 Moray played as a solo performer, becoming well known for using a laptop and loop pedals live. After the release of Sweet England in 2003, he began playing with a variety of accompanying musicians, notably drummer Laurence Hunt. This flexible line-up toured extensively as an electric band, with Moray playing electric guitar and supplemented by samples and sequences from laptops onstage.

Following the Jim Moray album, during 2007–2008 Moray's line-up solidified around a core of melodeon player Nick Cooke and violinist James Delarre, frequently performing as an acoustic trio before eventually adding drummer William Bowerman in 2008. Bowerman left the band in summer 2009 to join electro-pop act La Roux and was replaced by Dave Burbidge. After puncturing both lungs, Cooke was replaced by Saul Rose for some festival appearances in summer 2009. In 2012 Moray toured with an expanded "Skulk Ensemble" to play the Skulk album live, with added brass, bass and his sister Jackie Oates on backing vocals. In November 2013 Moray staged a 10th Anniversary Performance of his first album Sweet England at the Union Chapel in Islington, London featuring a string section and special guests including Bella Hardy, Jackie Oates, Keston Cobblers Club and Maz O'Connor. 

In 2017 Moray assembled a 10-piece band featuring strings, woodwind and an electric rhythm section to play the music from his Upcetera album on tour. This line up was invited to close the show at the 2017 BBC Radio 2 Folk Awards held at the Royal Albert Hall.

As an opening act or collaborator, Moray has toured with Oysterband, Eliza Carthy, Billy Bragg, Richard Thompson, Ani Di Franco, Bellowhead, The Cecil Sharp Project and John McCusker. He also performed as Orpheus in Anaïs Mitchell's folk opera, Hadestown in January 2011 at the Union Chapel in London.

In 2012 Moray wrote and performed music for the Bristol Old Vic produced show The Islanders, a collaboration with Art Brut frontman  Eddie Argos, and writer and performer Amy Mason.

Discography

Performer
I Am Jim Moray (EP) (2001)
Sweet England (2003)
Sprig of Thyme (single) (2004)
Jim Moray (2006)
Barbara Allen (vinyl single) (2006)
Low Culture (2008)
Lucy Wan (single) (2009)
In Modern History (2010)
A Beginners Guide (compilation) (2010)
Big Love (single) (2011)
Skulk (2012)
Upcetera (2016)
The Outlander (2019)

Producer or guest musicianGlance – Rose Kemp (piano and programming) (2003); Rose Kemp later provided additional vocals for the album Jim MorayBig Session Vol. 1 – Oysterband (vocal/guitar/piano and production/mixing) (2004)Strange Histories – James Raynard (production/mixing and vocal/bouzouki/concertina/piano) (2005)The Violet Hour – Jackie Oates (production/song-writing and guitar/tenor guitar/double bass/drums/piano on the track "The Wishfulness Waltz") (2008)Roodumdah – Wheeler Street (production/melodeon/keyboards) (2009)Hyperboreans – Jackie Oates (production/bass/guitars/keyboards) (2009)The Mother of All Morris – Ashley Hutchings (vocal/guitar on track "Black Joke") (2009)Find The Lady – Belshazzars Feast (production/mixing) (2010)Cecil Sharp Project – contributed tracks "Dear Kimber" and "Earl Brand" (2011)Revenge of the Folksingers – (Concerto Caledonia) (vocal on tracks "My Lord of Marche Pavem", "The Foggy Dew", "Delighted/The Lincolnshire Poacher") (2011)This Willowed Light – Maz O'Connor (production/mixing) (2014)The Spyglass And The Herringbone – Jackie Oates (production/mixing/arrangements) (2015)Stories Sung, Truths Told – Tir Eolas (production/mixing) (2015)Salvor – False Lights (production/mixing/writing/performance) (2015)Hadelin – Chris Foster (production/mixing/performance) (2016)Harmonograph – False Lights (production/mixing/writing/performance) (2018)Wham! Bang! Pow! Let's Rock Out! - Art Brut (production/mixing) (2019)Vivaldi Sleep – Orchestra Of The Swan (vocals, arranging) (2021)Labyrinths'' – Orchestra Of The Swan (vocals, arranging) (2021)

References

External links
www.jimmoray.co.uk
 Jim Moray video interview

English folk musicians
Living people
1981 births
Alumni of Birmingham Conservatoire
English folk singers
21st-century multi-instrumentalists
Musicians_from_Bristol